The Teutons were an ancient northern European tribe mentioned by Roman authors. The Teutons are best known for their participation, together with the Cimbri and other groups, in the Cimbrian War with the Roman Republic in the late second century BC.

Julius Caesar described them as a Germanic people, a term he applied to all northern peoples located east of the Rhine, and later Roman authors followed his identification. On one hand, there is no direct evidence about whether or not they spoke a Germanic language, and evidence such as their name and the names of their rulers indicate at least a strong influence from Celtic languages. On the other hand the indications that classical authors gave about the homeland of the Teutones is considered by many scholars to show that they lived in an area associated with early Germanic languages, but not in an area associated with Celtic languages.

Name 
The ethnonym is attested in Latin as Teutonēs or Teutoni (plural) or, more rarely, as Teuton or Teutonus (singular). It transparently derives from the Proto-Indo-European (PIE) stem *teuteh₂- ('people, tribe, crowd') attached to the suffix -ones, which is commonly found in both Celtic (Lingones, Senones, etc.) and Germanic (Ingvaeones, Semnones, etc.) tribal names during the Roman era. The stem apparently had a lower-class connotation, as opposed to an elite group or a ruling class and its original meaning in PIE times may have been 'the people under arms', as suggested by the Hittite tuzzi- and the Luwian tuta ('army').

Thus, the name Teutones may be interpreted as deriving from Proto-Celtic *towtā ('people, tribe'), or it may have been from a stage of Germanic language development prior to the first consonantal shift ("pre-Germanic") (compare the later form *þeudō- 'nation, people, folk'; cf. Gothic þiuda). A possible corruption of the original name by Greek and Latin writers makes the attribution less secure.

The much later use of Teuton to refer to speakers of West Germanic languages occurred in the Latin of monastic writers by the ninth century and has continued into modern times. It originally served as a learned classical Latin word to be used instead of the similar sounding "theodiscus", an older term that was a Latinization of the then-current pronunciations of the West Germanic word for "of the people". 

In modern English, "Teuton" often has been used in a still broader way to mean the same as "Germanic".

Linguistic affiliations 
The Teutons commonly are classified as a Germanic tribe and thought probably to have spoken a Germanic language, although the evidence is fragmentary. However, because of the non-Germanic, possibly Celtic, form of the names of both the Teutones and their associates the Cimbri, as well as the personal names known from these tribes, some historians have suggested a Celtic origin for the Teutones.

The earliest classical writers classified the Teutones as Celts, but more generally they did not distinguish between Celtic and Germanic peoples. Apparently, this distinction was first made by Julius Caesar, whose main concern was to argue that raids into southern Gaul and Italy by northern peoples who were less softened by Mediterranean civilization, should be seen in Rome as a systematic problem that can repeat in the future, and thereby demanded pre-emptive military action. This was his justification for invading northern Gaul.

After Caesar, Strabo (died circa AD 24) and Marcus Velleius Paterculus (died circa AD 31) classify Teutons as Germanic peoples. Pliny also classified them this way and specified that they were among the Ingaevones, related to the Cimbri and Chauci.

Homeland 
The fourth century BC traveller, Pytheas, as reported by Pliny the Elder (died AD 79), described the Teutones as neighbours of the northern island of Abalus where amber washes up in the spring, which was traded from these Teutones. Abalus is one day's sail from a tidal marsh or estuary facing the ocean (an aestuarium) called Metuonis where the Germanic "Guiones" (probably an error for Inguaeones, Gutones, or the Teutones) lived. 

Pomponius Mela (died circa AD 45) placed the Teutons on the largest island, Codannovia, presumed to be Scandinavia, which was one of a group of islands in a large bay called Codanus, open to the ocean. Traditionally, scholars interpret this bay as the Baltic sea. 
31. On the other side of the Albis [Elbe], the huge Codanus Bay [Baltic Sea] is filled with big and small islands. For this reason, where the sea is received within the fold of the bay, it never lies wide open and never really looks like a sea but is sprinkled around, rambling and scattered like rivers, with water flowing in every direction and crossing many times. Where the sea comes into contact with the mainland, the sea is contained by the banks of islands, banks that are not far offshore and that are virtually equidistant everywhere. There the sea runs a narrow course like a strait, then, curving, it promptly adapts to a long brow of land. 32. On the bay are the Cimbri and the Teutoni; farther on, the farthest people of Germany, the Hermiones.
[...]
54. The thirty Orcades [Orkney Islands] are separated by narrow spaces between them; the seven Haemodae [Denmark] extend opposite Germany in what we have called Codanus Bay; of the islands there, Scandinavia [sic: the manuscript has Codannavia], which the Teutoni still hold, stands out as much for its size as for its fertility besides.

Plutarch in his biography of Marius, who fought the Teutones, wrote that they and Cimbri "had not had intercourse with other peoples, and had traversed a great stretch of country, so that it could not be ascertained what people it was nor whence they had set out". He reported that there were different conjectures: that they were "some of the German peoples which extended as far as the northern ocean"; that they were "Galloscythians", a mixture of Scythians and Celts who had lived as far east as the Black Sea, or that the Cimbri were Cimmerians, from even farther east.

Surviving texts based on the work of the geographer Ptolemy mentioned both Teutones and "Teutonoaroi" in Germania, but this is in a part of his text that has become garbled in surviving copies. Gudmund Schütte proposed that the two peoples should be understood as one, but that different versions of works based on that of Ptolemy used literary sources such as Pliny and Mela to place them in different positions somewhere near the Cimbri, in a part of the landscape they did not have good information for – either in Zealand or Scandinavia, or else somewhere on the southern Baltic coast.

The name of the district of Thy in Jutland has been connected to the name of the Teutons, a proposal in line with ancient reports that they came from that area.

Cimbrian War 

After achieving decisive victories over the Romans at Noreia and Arausio in 105 BC, the Cimbri and Teutones divided their forces. Gaius Marius then defeated them separately in 102 BC and 101 BC respectively, ending the Cimbrian War. The defeat of the Teutones occurred at the Battle of Aquae Sextiae (near present-day Aix-en-Provence).

According to the writings of Valerius Maximus and Florus, the king of the Teutones, Teutobod, was taken in irons after the Teutones were defeated by the Romans. Under the conditions of the surrender, three hundred married women were to be handed over to the victorious Romans as concubines and slaves. When the matrons of the Teutones heard of this stipulation, they begged the consul that they might instead be allowed to minister in the temples of Ceres and Venus. When their request was denied, the Teutonic women slew their own children. The next morning, all the women were found dead in each other's arms, having strangled each other during the night. Their joint martyrdom passed into Roman legends of Teutonic fury.

Reportedly, some surviving captives participated as the rebelling gladiators in the Third Servile War of 73-71 BC.

See also 
 Furor Teutonicus

References 

 Fick, August, Alf Torp and Hjalmar Falk: Vergleichendes Wörterbuch der Indogermanischen Sprachen. Part 3, Wortschatz der Germanischen Spracheinheit. 4. Aufl. (Göttingen: Vandenhoeck and Ruprecht), 1909.
Attribution:

External links 

 

Pre-Roman Iron Age
Cimbrian War
Ingaevones